Oleksandrivka is an urban-type settlement in Voznesensk Raion, Mykolaiv Oblast, Ukraine. It hosts the administration of Oleksandrivka settlement hromada, one of the hromadas of Ukraine. Population: 

History
In 1923, uyezds in Ukrainian Soviet Socialist Republic were abolished, and the governorates were divided into okruhas. In 1923, Voznesensk Raion with the administrative center located in Voznesensk was established. It belonged to Mykolaiv Okruha of Odessa Governorate. Oleksandrivka was included in Voznesensk Raion. In 1925, the governorates were abolished, and okruhas were directly subordinated to Ukrainian SSR. In 1930, okruhas were abolished, and on 27 February 1932, Odessa Oblast was established, and Voznesensk Raion was included into Odessa Oblast. In 1968, Olexandrivka was granted urban-type settlement status.

Economy
The town has a dam and hydroelectric power station, Oleksandrivka HES, operated by Energoatom. The station is part of the South Ukraine Energy Complex, which includes the Tashlyk Pumped-Storage Power Plant and the South Ukraine Nuclear Power Plant in Yuzhnoukrainsk. The water reservoir created by the dam is part of the National nature park "Buh Gard" (formerly known as Granite-steppe lands of Buh).

Transportation
Olexandrivka railway station is several kilometers south of the settlement, but the closest railway station is in Trykratne,  from Oleksandrivka. Both stations are on the railway line connecting Tokarivka and Pomichna.

References

Urban-type settlements in Voznesensk Raion